CGM may stand for:

 CGM (rap group), a British hip hop collective 
 Camiguin Airport
 Cassava green mite
 Chloë Grace Moretz, an American actress
 Providence (religious movement), whose official name translates as Christian Gospel Mission
 Codex germanicus monacensis, a German-language manuscript in the Bavarian State Library in Munich
 Compagnie Générale Maritime, a French shipping line
 Computer Games Magazine
 Computer Graphics Metafile
 Conjugate gradient method, an algorithm for the numerical solution of particular systems of linear equations
 Conspicuous Gallantry Medal
 Continuous glucose monitor, a monitoring device for diabetics
 Corn gluten meal
 CTVglobemedia, a Canadian media conglomerate
 Consumer generated media

See also